Yuny station is a railway station located in St. Petersburg, Russia.

It was constructed by the JSC Primorskaya Saint Peterburg–Sestroretsk railway and was opened as part of the Ozerki line on July 23, 1893, under the name Grafskiy Pavilion (in translation - Count pavilion).

In 1948, the narrow-gauge Small October railway was created here. In 1955, platforms were constructed and the station received the name Yuny.

Landmarks near Yuny station
Russian poet Maximilian Voloshin mentions the station Grafskiy Pavilion in his diary and reports that there was a summer residence here at which, in May 1926, Maxim Gorky and Anton Chekhov met one of their notability unidentified people.

References

Railway stations in Saint Petersburg
Railway stations in the Russian Empire opened in 1893